Brent Hill is the site of an Iron Age hill fort situated close to South Brent in Devon, England. The fort occupies the top of Brent Hill at approx 311 Metres above Sea Level.

References

External links 
 Brent Hill at legendarydartmoor.co.uk

Hill forts in Devon
Hills of Devon